Eugene Bianco (March 29, 1927 – May 7, 2007), known professionally as Bianco, was a harpist who recorded for RCA Victor Records.

Discography

With Ruth Brown 
Ruth Brown '65 (Mainstream, 1965)

References 

1927 births
2007 deaths
Harpists
Easy listening musicians
RCA Records artists
Musicians from Hartford, Connecticut
20th-century American musicians